Golan the Insatiable is an American animated television series that originally aired on Fox on November 23, 2013 along with Lucas Bros. Moving Co.; it officially premiered on January 11, 2014. It was created by Josh Miller and developed by Dave Jeser & Matt Silverstein. It is based on stories written by Miller that appeared on the website Something Awful. It aired on Fox's Animation Domination HD programming block.

Golan the Insatiable was picked up by Fox for a second season consisting of 6 half-hour prime-time episodes featuring a new voice cast and alternate continuity. The season premiered on May 31, 2015 on Fox's Sunday Funday lineup.

Plot
Golan the Insatiable is a demigod warlord who reigned the dimension of Gkruool with an iron fist before he was summoned to Earth by the goth daughter Dylan of the Beekler family in the town of Oak Grove, Minnesota. He stays with her after finding out that his acolyte Kruung has overthrown him for control of Gkruool during his absence. Besides learning about Earth's customs and causing havoc in Oak Grove, Golan plans to build up his power so that he can return to Gkruool and take revenge on Kruung.

Characters

Main characters
 Golan the Insatiable (voiced by Josh Miller in Season One, Rob Riggle in Season Two) - Golan the Insatiable is the "Godlord terrible of Gkruool, crusher of wills, defiler of all."   In the original shorts, he was banished by Gkruool's rebels and lives with Dylan Beekler. In the 30 minute reboot, Golan was accidentally summoned to Earth by Dylan, who had acquired the legendary  Gkruoolian Tome of Infinite Evil, and later remains with her after finding that Kruung has overthrown him during his disappearance. They both enjoy causing misery to the citizens of the city. In season one, he gets used to Earth's customs. In season two, he plans to take over Oak Grove then Minnesota along with Dylan.
 Dylan Beekler (voiced by Mary Mack in Season One, Aubrey Plaza in Season Two) - Dylan Beekler is a goth girl who's Golan's new acolyte. She used to get suspended a lot at school. Her mother is Carole Beekler, and her older sister is Alexis Beekler (although later, it is revealed that Alexis is Dylan's mother, with Carole lying to protect her daughter and granddaughter from emotional pain and complications). Despite her hatred to most people in "Winter is Staying," she enjoyed being her mom's favorite and enjoyed spending time with her. Also in "Deer Uncle Gerald," she couldn't go through with stealing the ashes of her Great Uncle Gerald for her and Golan's plan and let his ashes in the river as she wishes.
 Carole Beekler (voiced by Maria Bamford) - Carole Beekler is Dylan and Alexis' single mother in season two. She was initially extremely terrified of Golan but eventually got used to him. Although she doesn't much approve of Dylan's goth lifestyle she still loves her, although she is seen being with Alexis a lot as well. According to Alexis, she is her mother's favorite child.
 Richard Beekler (voiced by Matt Silverstein) - Richard Beekler is the husband of Carole Beekler and father of the Beekler children. He doesn't consider Golan as family as much as the others. He is not included in the reboot. It is claimed by Carole that Dylan doesn't have a father and implied that he left her at some point. It was also claimed by Alexis that Richard died from contracting "Robot AIDS."
 Alexis Beekler (voiced by Rachel Butera) - Alexis Beekler is Carole's daughter, Dylan's sister, and Keith's girlfriend. She is very obnoxious and slightly dimwitted. She constantly makes fun of Dylan by calling her names like "Butt Licks" and "Fart Sponge", just as similar as Dylan loves harassing her, it has also been shown that Dylan has lit her on fire numerous times. Despite her intelligence, she figured out Dylan and Golan's plan about winter and was the only one who was able to get her to stop in "Winter is Staying". She enjoys spending time with her mother and always has her back.
 Keith Knudsen Jr. (voiced by Nick Rutherford) - Keith Knudsen Jr. is Alexis' boyfriend who is the son of Keith Knudsen Sr. He is friendly with Golan. Alexis is the only one in the Beekler family who tolerates him.

Recurring characters
 Mayor of Oak Grove (voiced by Josh Miller in Season One, John DiMaggio in Season Two) - The unnamed Mayor of Oak Grove is Oak Grove's jolly and short mayor. It is hinted he might be gay. He carries a duck around with him as the city mascot.
 Mrs. Budnick (voiced by Kaitlyn Robrock) - Mrs. Budnick is Oak Grove Elementary's short-tempered elderly teacher.
 Mackenzie B (voiced by Abbey DiGregorio in Season One, Tara Strong in Season Two) - Mackenzie B is Dylan's archenemy and classmate in school who constantly makes fun of Dylan. She is usually afraid of Golan as her mother forces her to invite Dylan to her parties.
 Swingley (voiced by Maria Bamford) - Swingley is a new kid in Dylan's class whom she has a crush on. In Season 2, she admits she likes him only for Swingley to reveal that he is gay and already has a boyfriend.
 Keith Knudsen Sr. (voiced by Ken Marino) - The father of Keith Knudsen Jr. and the husband of Go-Go Knudsen. He often expects his son to succeed in specific things.
 Go-Go Knudsen (voiced by Cree Summer) - The busty mother of Keith Knudsen Jr. and the wife of Keith Knudsen Sr.

Episodes

Series overview

Season 1 (2013–14)

Season 2 (2015)

References

External links
 
 Series of articles on which Golan the Insatiable was based, at Something Awful

2013 American television series debuts
2015 American television series endings
2010s American adult animated television series
2010s American animated comedy television series
2010s American black comedy television series
American adult animated comedy television series
American adult animated fantasy television series
American adult animated horror television series
American flash adult animated television series
English-language television shows
Fox Broadcasting Company original programming
Fictional demons and devils
Gothic television shows
Television series based on Internet-based works
Television series by 20th Century Fox Television
Television series by Fox Television Animation
Animated television series about dysfunctional families
Television shows set in Minnesota